Thorpe by Water is a village and civil parish in the county of Rutland in the East Midlands of England. The population at the 2001 Census was 56. At the 2011 Census the population remained less than 100 and is included in the civil parish of Seaton.

The village's name means 'outlying farm/settlement'. 'By water' refers to the nearby River Welland.

References

External links

Villages in Rutland
Civil parishes in Rutland